The n-octanol-water partition coefficient, Kow is a partition coefficient for the two-phase system consisting of n-octanol and water. Kow is also frequently referred to by the symbol P, especially in the English literature. It is also called n-octanol-water partition ratio. 

Kow serves as a measure of the relationship between lipophilicity (fat solubility) and hydrophilicity (water solubility) of a substance. The value is greater than one if a substance is more soluble in fat-like solvents such as n-octanol, and less than one if it is more soluble in water.

If a substance is present as several chemical species in the octanol-water system due to association or dissociation, each species is assigned its own Kow value. A related value, D, does not distinguish between different species, only indicating the concentration ratio of the substance between the two phases.

History 

In 1899, Charles Ernest Overton and Hans Horst Meyer independently proposed that the tadpole toxicity of non-ionizable organic compounds depends on their ability to partition into lipophilic compartments of cells. They further proposed the use of the partition coefficient in an olive oil/water mixture as an estimate of this lipophilic associated toxicity. Corwin Hansch later proposed the use of n-octanol as an inexpensive synthetic alcohol that could be obtained in a pure form as an alternative to olive oil.

Applications 
Kow values are used, among others, to assess the environmental fate of persistent organic pollutants. Chemicals with high partition coefficients, for example, tend to accumulate in the fatty tissue of organisms (bioaccumulation). Under the Stockholm Convention, chemicals with a log Kow greater than 5 are considered to bioaccumulate.

Furthermore, the parameter plays an important role in drug research (Rule of Five) and toxicology. Ernst Overton and Hans Meyer discovered as early as 1900 that the efficacy of an anaesthetic increased with increasing Kow value (the so-called Meyer-Overton rule).

Kow values also provide a good estimate of how a substance is distributed within a cell between the lipophilic biomembranes and the aqueous cytosol.

Estimation 
Since it is not possible to measure Kow for all substances, various models have been developed to allow for their prediction, e.g. Quantitative structure–activity relationships (QSAR) or linear free energy relationships (LFER) such as the Hammett equation.

A variant of the UNIFAC system can also be used to estimate octanol-water partition coefficients.

Equations 

 Definition of the Kow or P-value

 The Kow or P-value always only refers to a single species or substance:

 with:
 concentration of species i of a substance in the octanol-rich phase
 concentration of species i of a substance in the water-rich phase

 If different species occur in the octanol-water system by dissociation or association, several P-values and one D-value exist for the system. If, on the other hand, the substance is only present in a single species, the P and D values are identical.

 P is usually expressed as a common logarithm, i.e. Log P (also Log Pow or, less frequently, Log pOW):

 Log P is positive for lipophilic and negative for hydrophilic substances or species.

 Definition of the D-value

 The D-value only correctly refers to the concentration ratio of a single substance distributed between the octanol and water phases. In the case of a substance that occurs as multiple species, it can therefore be calculated by summing the concentrations of all n species in the octanol phase and the concentrations of all n species in the aqueous phase:

 with:
  concentration of the substance in the octanol-rich phase
  concentration of the substance in the water-rich phase

 D values are also usually given in the form of the common logarithm as Log D:

 Like Log P, Log D is positive for lipophilic and negative for hydrophilic substances. While P values are largely independent of the pH value of the aqueous phase due to their restriction to only one species, D values are often strongly dependent on the pH value of the aqueous phase.

Example values 
Values for log Kow typically range between -3 (very hydrophilic) and +10 (extremely lipophilic/hydrophobic).

The values listed here are sorted by the partition coefficient. Acetamide is hydrophilic, and 2,2′,4,4′,5-Pentachlorobiphenyl is lipophilic.

See also 

 Hydrophobic effect
 Dortmund Data Bank

References

Further reading 

 </ref>

External links 

 Virtual Computational Chemistry Laboratory interactive calculation and interactive comparison of several methods
 LogP-Berechnungssoftware von ACD (commercial)
 Directory of reference works and databases with octanol-water partition coefficients
 Comprehensive free database of evaluated octanol-water partition coefficients from Sangster Research Laboratories

Ecotoxicology
Pharmacology
Physical chemistry